The Cann River East Branch is a perennial river located in the East Gippsland region of the Australian state of Victoria.

Course and features
The Cann River East Branch rises southwest of Mount Coopracambra in remote country on the western boundary of the Coopracambra National Park and flows generally south, joined by three minor tributaries before reaching its confluence with the Cann River, south of the locality of Weeragua in the Shire of East Gippsland. The river descends  over its  course.

The Monaro Highway runs parallel to the course of the river.

See also

 East Gippsland Catchment Management Authority
 List of rivers of Australia

References

External links
 
 
 

East Gippsland catchment
Rivers of Gippsland (region)